Howe Sound Secondary is a public Secondary school in Squamish, British Columbia part of School District 48 Howe Sound. It is the largest school in the district, and is one of 2 schools in Squamish to offer grades 10–12.

History
A new building was erected in the 1950s.  In 1996 a new gymnasium was added and other renovations were undertaken.

Lawsuit
The 1996 addition suffered problems of water infiltration that culminated in a notable decision by the Supreme Court of British Columbia.  Following substantial completion of the project in the fall of 1996, problems of water ingress in the crawlspace, walls, and skylights were discovered.  The architect and contractor continued to address the problems for several years.  In September 2003 the school district began legal proceedings against the architects for the alleged problems.  This resulted in the 2007 court decision, The Board of School Trustees of School District No. 48 (Howe Sound) v. Killick Metz Bowen Rose Architects and Planners Inc. et al.   The decision held that the standard architect-client contract limiting the term of the architect's liability to six years following substantial completion was valid, and as the school district took more than six years to take legal action, the architect's liability had expired.  The case was dismissed and costs awarded to the architects.

Notable alumni
Neal Kindree (national mountain bike racer) 
Mike Sweeney (played in FIFA World Cup)  
Mike Carney (Olympic ski racer)
Sarah Bourque (HSAS) (freestyle skiing) (World Champion freestyle skier, Olympic freestyle innovator)
Jamie Cudmore (HSAS) (rugby) (3 time Rugby World Cup Canadian rep 2003, 2007, 2011)

References

External links
Ministry of Education school information

High schools in British Columbia
Educational institutions in Canada with year of establishment missing